South Plaquemines High School (SPHS) is a grade 7–12 junior and senior high school in Buras, a census-designated place in Plaquemines Parish, Louisiana. A part of Plaquemines Parish School Board, it serves Boothville, Buras, Empire, Port Sulphur, and Venice. In 2006 Jeré Longman of The New York Times described South Plaquemines High as "one of Louisiana’s smaller high schools".

History
It was formed after Hurricane Katrina damaged Buras Middle School (6-8), Buras High School (PK-5 and 9-12), Port Sulphur High School (PK-12), and Boothville-Venice High School (PK-12) in 2005. The permanent school building was established on the site of the former Buras Middle School, while faculty residences reside on the property of the former Buras High School. The permanent building had a cost of $27 million.

The school opened in mid-August 2006.  Prior to the opening of the permanent building, the school operated out of temporary facilities on the site of the former Port Sulphur High School. The students selected the school mascot, the Hurricanes, since the community had weathered a hurricane; the other choices were the gators and the eagles.  the school had 266 students. In October 2006 the cafeteria at the temporary site had not yet opened and the science labs were not yet fully stocked with equipment. The hallways of the temporary school building were named Hurricane Alley, Katrina Way and Rita Way.

In 2009–2010 the school had 348 students, and this increased to 376 by 2010–2011.

School culture and academic performance
,  many parents of South Plaquemines students only had high school educations, and many students came from low socioeconomic families. South Plaquemines officials stated that teenage pregnancy was an issue at the school.

Athletics
South Plaquemines High athletics competes in the LHSAA.

Athletics history
Football history
American football has been a popular sport in the south Plaquemines community prior to the establishment of South Plaquemines High. Initially the school American football team used borrowed property  from the temporary school facilities. This is because the athletic field at Port Sulphur High, the temporary South Plaquemines High location, had no scoreboard, no working bleachers, and no working lights. In late August 2006 the field at Port Sulphur had been re-sodded, but it took weeks for the grass to grow. Further preparations came as new goal posts and scoreboards were installed.

Cyril Crutchfield, who formerly coached the American football team of Port Sulphur High School, served as the football team coach of South Plaquemines after the school first opened; he remained as coach by 2009. In 2006 there was no gymnasium at the school and no band equipment, so unlike most teams, South Plaquemines did not have a band nor a pep rally. The team did not have a weight room nor a locker room. For its first season in 2006 it only had one home game. The players, many of whom had not played for years, came from schools that were previously rival teams and had used different playing styles. In 2007, at the beginning of the season, about one third of the players of the football team were still living in trailers provided by the Federal Emergency Management Agency (FEMA). Longman added that "It is in many ways remarkable that South Plaquemines qualified for the state playoffs in Class 2A" in 2006. The National Football League later gave a $35,000 grant, and Longman stated that it could be used for a weight room.

Jeré Longman of The New York Times wrote that the sport became "a refuge" for the post-Katrina South Plaquemines community. In its first season (2006), South Plaquemines lost to Clinton High School 48-16. In 2007 and 2008 South Plaquemines won Class 1A titles in the State of Louisiana, and in 2009 it was the 1A runner up. Steven Weins served as the coach until 2016. 34-year old Ferrante Dominique, previously of White Castle High School, became the coach of the football team of South Plaquemines High in 2016. 

The permanent school added artificial turf to its stadium.

Basketball history

Championships
Football championships
(2) State Championships: 2007, 2008

Notable people

 Rodney Bartholomew (Class of 2006-2007) Former Professional Basketball Player (NBA Oklahoma City Thunder - Oklahoma City Blue/Tulsa 66ers) (2012-2014)
 Bradley Sylve (Class of 2011), current cornerback of the DC Defenders in the XFL

References

External links
South Plaquemines High School
School map

Series about the South Plaquemines Hurricanes by Jere Longman of The New York Times

Schools in Plaquemines Parish, Louisiana
Public middle schools in Louisiana
Public high schools in Louisiana
2006 establishments in Louisiana
Educational institutions established in 2006